Kalewa is a town at the confluence of the Chindwin River and the Myittha River in Kale District, Sagaing Region of north-western Myanmar.  It is the administrative seat of Kalewa Township.

Climate

Kalewa has a tropical savanna climate (Köppen climate classification Aw). Temperatures are very warm throughout the year, although the winter months (December–February) are milder. There is a winter dry season (November–April) and a summer wet season (May–October).

Economy
Upstream from Mandalay and Monywa on the Chindwin River, Kalewa is gaining importance as a staging point for trade between Burma and India.

See also
 Human rights in Burma
 Internal conflict in Burma

References

See also
Chaube, S.K. 1999. Hill Politics in North-east India. Patna: Orient Longman.
Lalsiampuii, s. 1997. Mizoram. New Delhi: Ministry of Information and Broadcasting. Govt. of India.
Johnny, N.E. 1991. Lushai custom; A monograph on Lushai customs and ceremonies. Aizawl: Tribal Research Institute.
Tribal Research Institute. 1991. Tribal Research Institute, Directorate of Art and Culture.
Tribal Research. 1980. The Tribes of Mizos. (A Dissertation): Tribal Research Institute.
 "The Lost Tribes of Israel", Tudor Parfitt, Phoenix, 2002. 

Populated places in Sagaing Region
Township capitals of Myanmar